Papcastle railway station was on the single track Derwent Branch of the Maryport and Carlisle Railway (M&CR) in the then county of Cumberland, now Cumbria, England.

The station was opened in 1867, situated over a mile from the village of Papcastle. Sidings to the substantial Broughtoncraggs Quarry led off the line opposite the station.

Passenger services
Until 1914 all passenger trains along the branch called at Papcastle, from 1887, by request.

By June 1876 this pattern continued, with two trains added each way on Sundays between Cockermouth and Bullgill.

It is not clear whether passengers had to change at Bullgill or whether a reversal took place there as well as at Brigham. Two trains from Maryport and one Bullgill, with balancing services, ran on Sundays.  and Papcastle were shown as "Signal Stops" where intending passengers had to inform railway staff who would stop the train accordingly. In the case of Papcastle this meant alerting a platelayer's wife living nearby.

In 1914 Sunday trains were withdrawn.

Sources differ when Papcastle closed. One says it lost even its Signal Stop status (by implication, closed) in 1914 whilst others give its closure date as 1921. Unadvertised calls were made for quarrymen until at least May 1922.

The journey time from Cockermouth to Bullgill averaged 25 minutes.

In 1922 six trains passed through the station in each direction, Monday to Saturday, with no Sunday service.

This was theoretical for the residents of Papcastle for two reasons, first, the trains didn't stop at "their" station and second, they could walk to Cockermouth more quickly than they could walk to Papcastle station.

Unusually for those times the tracks were lifted not long after closure, with a tragic consequence, when a bridge was being demolished a girder fell on two men and killed them.

Afterlife
In 2020 the station was in use as a dwelling.

See also

 Maryport & Carlisle Railway
 Whitehaven, Cleator and Egremont Railway
 Cleator and Workington Junction Railway
 Cockermouth & Workington Railway

References

Sources

Further reading

External links
 The station on an Edwardian OS map National Library of Scotland
 The station and line Rail Map Online
 The station on the branch, with mileages Railway Codes

Disused railway stations in Cumbria
Former Maryport and Carlisle Railway stations
Railway stations in Great Britain opened in 1867
Railway stations in Great Britain closed in 1921